The Peacekeeper Revolver is the light gun released for the Philips CD-i multimedia system. It was released in 1994 and was bundled with Mad Dog McCree, retailing for $60 (USD). The gun required manual calibration, accomplished via menu options in all supported games.

It used an infrared device positioned next to the screen in order for it to register movement, making the Peacekeeper unusual compared to most other light guns of the era, which were reliant on the scanout of CRTs to function. Beginning in 2011, there was a patent dispute between Philips and Nintendo over the use of the technology (a remote and a “sensor” bar) for the Wii (and later the Wii U), which was settled out of court in 2014.

Games 
 Atlantis: The Last Resort
 Burn:Cycle
 Chaos Control
 Crime Patrol
 Crime Patrol 2: Drug Wars
 The Last Bounty Hunter
 The Lost Ride
 Mad Dog McCree
 Mad Dog II: The Lost Gold
 Thunder in Paradise
 Who Shot Johnny Rock?

References 

Light guns